Worthington is a city in and the county seat of Nobles County, Minnesota, United States. The population was 13,947 at the time of the 2020 census.

The city's site was first settled in the 1870s as Okabena Station on a line of the Chicago, St. Paul, Minneapolis and Omaha Railway, later the Chicago and North Western Railway (now part of the Union Pacific Railroad) where steam engines would take on water from adjacent Lake Okabena. More people entered, along with one A. P. Miller of Toledo, Ohio, under a firm called the National Colony Organization. Miller named the new city after his wife's maiden name.

History
The first European likely to have visited the Nobles County area of southwestern Minnesota was French explorer Joseph Nicollet. Nicollet mapped the area between the Mississippi and Missouri Rivers in the 1830s. He called the region "Sisseton Country" in honor of the Sisseton band of Dakota Indians then living there. It was a rolling sea of wide open prairie grass that extended as far as the eye could see. One small lake in Sisseton Country was given the name "Lake Okabena" on Nicollet's map, "Okabena" being a Dakota word meaning "nesting place of the herons".

The town of Worthington was founded by "Yankees" (immigrants from New England and upstate New York who were descended from the English Puritans who settled New England in the 1600s).

In 1871, the St. Paul & Sioux City Railway Company began connecting its two namesake cities with a rail line. The steam engines of that time required a large quantity of water, resulting in water stations being needed every  along their routes. One of these stations, at the site of present-day Worthington, was designated "The Okabena Railway Station".

Meanwhile, in that same year, Professor Ransom Humiston of Cleveland, Ohio, and Dr. A.P. Miller, editor of the Toledo Blade, organized a company to locate a colony of New England settlers who had already settled in Northern Ohio along the tracks of the Sioux City and St. Paul Railway. These people were "Yankee" settlers whose parents had moved from New England to the region of Northeast Ohio known as the Connecticut Western Reserve. They were primarily members of the Congregational Church, though due to the Second Great Awakening, many of them had converted to Methodism and Presbyterianism, and some had become Baptists before coming to what is now Minnesota. This colony, the National Colony, was to be a village of temperance, a place where evangelical Methodists, Presbyterians, Congregationalists, and Baptists could live free of the temptations of alcohol. A town was plotted, and the name was changed from the Okabena Railway Station to Worthington, Miller's mother-in-law's maiden name.

On April 29, 1872, regular passenger train service to Worthington started, and on that first train were the first of the National Colony settlers. One early arrival described the scene:

We were among the first members of the colony to arrive at the station of an unfinished railroad… There was a good hotel, well and comfortably furnished, one or two stores neatly furnished and already stocked with goods, [and] several other[s] in process of erection… The streets, scarcely to be defined as such, were full of prairie schooners, containing families waiting until masters could suit themselves with "claims," the women pursuing their housewifely avocations meanwhile—some having cooking stoves in their wagons, others using gypsy fires to do their culinary work; all seeming happy and hopeful.

Some settlers from New England were drinking men, most of them Civil War veterans from Massachusetts and Maine, and they came into conflict with the temperance movement. A curious event took place on Worthington's very first Fourth of July celebration. Hearing that there was a keg of beer in the Worthington House Hotel, Humiston entered the hotel, seized the keg, dragged it outside, and destroyed it with an axe. A witness described what happened next:

Upon seeing this, the young men of the town thought it to be rather an imposition, and collected together, procured the services of the band, and under the direction of a military officer marched to the rear of the hotel, and with a wheelbarrow and shovel took the empty keg that had been broken open, and playing the dead march with flag at half staff marched to the flagpole in front of Humiston's office where they dug a grave and gave the empty keg a burial with all the honors attending a soldier's funeral.

They then, with flag at full mast and with lively air, marched back to the ice house, procured a full keg of beer, returning to the grave, resting the keg thereon. Then a general invitation was given to all who desired to partake, which many did until the keg was emptied... In the evening they reassembled, burning Prof. Humiston in effigy about 10 p.m. Thus ended the glorious Fourth at Worthington, Minn.

Despite tensions between pro- and anti-temperance factions, the town grew rapidly. By the end of summer in 1872, 85 buildings had been constructed where just one year before there had been only a field of prairie grass.

Settlers poured into the region. At first they came almost exclusively from the six New England states due to issues of overpopulation combined with land shortages. Some had come from Upstate New York and had parents and grandparents who had moved to that region from New England during the early 1800s and late 1700s. Due to the large number of New Englanders and New England transplants from upstate New York, Worthington, like much of Minnesota at the time, was very culturally continuous with early New England culture for much of its early history. It was the age of the Homestead Act, when  of government land could be claimed for free. All one had to do was live on the land and "improve" it, a vague requirement. In such an atmosphere, settlers without connection to the National Colony also arrived in great number, and few of those were temperance activists. The ensuing winter was severe, and swarms of grasshoppers stripped farmers' fields bare in the summer of 1873. Still, settlers came. 1874 produced a bumper harvest, followed by another grasshopper invasion in 1875. 1876 and 1877 were both good farming years. Grasshoppers returned for the last time in 1879, and a bright future began for southwestern Minnesota. According to the 1880 census, Nobles County had 4,435 residents, 636 of them in Worthington.

In the early 1900s German immigrants began arriving in Worthington in large numbers, not directly from Germany, but mostly from other places in the midwest, especially Ohio, where their communities had already been established.

Unlike in other parts of the country, the Germans did not face xenophobia in Nobles County, but were welcomed by the Yankee population. This led to many writing back to Ohio, which led to chain migration to the region, greatly increasing the German-American population. The "Yankee" population of Americans of English descent did not come into conflict with the German-American community for much of their early history together, but the two communities were divided on the issue of World War I, the Yankee community divided about and the Germans unanimously opposed to American entry into the war. The Yankee community was generally pro-British, but many also did not want the United States to enter the war. The Germans were sympathetic to Germany and did not want the United States to enter into a war against Germany, but the Germans were not anti-British. Before World War I, many German community leaders in Minnesota and Wisconsin spoke openly and enthusiastically about how much better America was than Germany, due primarily (in their eyes) to the presence of English law and the English political culture the Americans had inherited from the colonial era, which they contrasted with the turmoil and oppression in Germany they had so recently fled. Other immigrant groups followed the Germans, including settlers from Ireland, Norway and Sweden.

From 1939 to 1940, Worthington was home to the Worthington Cardinals, a minor league baseball team. Worthington played as a member of the Class D Western League. The Worthington Cardinals were an affiliate of the St. Louis Cardinals.

On December 12, 2006, the Immigration and Customs Enforcement (ICE) staged a coordinated predawn raid at the Swift & Company meat packing plant in Worthington and five other Swift plants in western states, interviewing workers and hauling hundreds off in buses.

Geography

Climate

Demographics

The U.S. Bureau of Census now classifies Worthington as a micropolitan area, with a population of 20,508. The area has had a relatively high level of immigration, mostly Hispanics, in the early 21st century. Some sources credit this immigration trend for revitalizing the city's economy, which had been constrained by a shrinking population.

2020 census

Note: the US Census treats Hispanic/Latino as an ethnic category. This table excludes Latinos from the racial categories and assigns them to a separate category. Hispanics/Latinos can be of any race.

2010 census
As of the census of 2010, there were 12,764 people, 4,458 households, and 2,917 families residing in the city. The racial makeup of the city was 62.2% White, 5.5% African American, 0.7% Native American, 8.6% Asian, 0.1% Pacific Islander, 20.5% from other races, and 2.4% from two or more races. Hispanic or Latino of any race were 35.4% of the population.

There were 4,458 households, of which 34.7% had children under the age of 18 living with them, 48.4% were married couples living together, 10.7% had a female householder with no husband present, 6.3% had a male householder with no wife present, and 34.6% were non-families. 28.4% of all households were made up of individuals, and 13.9% had someone living alone who was 65 years of age or older. The average household size was 2.79 and the average family size was 3.36.

The median age in the city was 33.5 years. 26.8% of residents were under the age of 18; 10.7% were between the ages of 18 and 24; 26.1% were from 25 to 44; 21.3% were from 45 to 64; and 15% were 65 years of age or older. The gender makeup of the city was 51.1% male and 48.9% female.

2000 census
As of the census of 2000, there were 11,283 people, 4,311 households, and 2,828 families residing in the city. The racial makeup of the city was 76.81% White, 1.91% African American, 0.49% Native American, 7.06% Asian, 0.13% Pacific Islander, 11.49% from other races, and 2.11% from two or more races. Hispanic or Latino of any race were 19.28% of the population.

There were 4,311 households, out of which 30.5% had children under the age of 18 living with them, 52.4% were married couples living together, 8.9% had a female householder with no husband present, and 34.4% were non-families. 28.9% of all households were made up of individuals, and 15.5% had someone living alone who was 65 years of age or older. The average household size was 2.55 and the average family size was 3.12.

In the city, the population was spread out, with 25.5% under the age of 18, 9.7% from 18 to 24, 27.1% from 25 to 44, 20.1% from 45 to 64, and 17.6% who were 65 years of age or older. The median age was 36 years. For every 100 females, there were 98.6 males. For every 100 females age 18 and over, there were 97.6 males.

The median income for a household in the city was $36,250, and the median income for a family was $44,643. Males had a median income of $28,750 versus $20,880 for females. The per capita income for the city was $18,078. About 9.1% of families and 13.3% of the population were below the poverty line, including 18.4% of those under age 18 and 12.3% of those age 65 or over.

Government
Worthington is in Minnesota's 1st congressional district, represented by Republican Brad Finstad of New Ulm. At the state level, Worthington is in Senate District 22, represented by Republican Bill Weber, and in House District 22B, represented by Republican Rod Hamilton.

Politics

Local politics
The mayor of Worthington is Mike Kuhle. City council members meet in City Hall on the second and fourth Mondays of every month to discuss objectives and goals for the city. The city is divided into two wards, with one at-large council member. The mayor and council members are elected to four-year terms.
Current Worthington city council members, in addition to Kuhle, include:
Larry Janssen, 1st Ward
Chris Kielblock, 1st Ward
Alaina Kolpin, 2nd Ward
Amy Ernst, 2nd Ward
Chad Cummings, At Large

Sister city
There is a sister-city relationship between Worthington and Crailsheim, Germany, the first such relationship in history between an American and a German city. The relationship began in 1947, when Martha (Cashel) McCarthy and her parents led a campaign to collect clothing and food for Crailsheim's citizens (who had endured the destruction of 90% of their city ten days prior to the end of World War II).

Education
Worthington is served by Independent School District 518. Worthington's school mascot is the Trojan, and its high school athletic teams play in the Big South Conference. ISD 518 is known regionally for its robust music program offerings, with band, string orchestra, choir, and theater ensembles open to all students. Worthington Senior High School's 'Spirit of Worthington' Trojan Marching Band, with over 160 members, is an ensemble that has performed nationally 5 times. The Trojans' performances included two at the 75th and 78th annual McDonald's Thanksgiving Day Parade in Chicago in 2008 and 2011, respectively. In 2019, the Trojans were a featured band at the Chic-fil-A Peach Bowl in Atlanta, Georgia. 
High School: Worthington High School Worthington Senior High School
Middle School: Worthington Middle School
Elementary School: Prairie Elementary School

Worthington's private, parochial schools include:
Worthington Christian School, which serves grades K-8. 
St. Mary's Elementary School, which serves grades K-6.

Worthington's local higher education institution is Minnesota West Community and Technical College. Minnesota West's Worthington campus is a two-year college that offers associate degrees in a wide variety of majors, along with diplomas and certificates in areas from practical nursing to accounting, among others.

Worthington and the surrounding area are served by the Nobles County Library, part of the Plum Creek Library System, which is based in the city.

Transportation
Highways
 Interstate 90
 U.S. Route 59
 Minnesota State Highway 60
 Minnesota State Highway 266 (decommissioned - designated as Nobles County Road 25)
 Nobles County Road 25
 Nobles County Road 35

Notable people
 Dwayne Andreas, CEO of Archer Daniels Midland and political donor, was born in Worthington
 Wayne R. Bassett Sr., librarian and Minnesota state legislator
 William Elijah Bloom, Minnesota state legislator
 Wendell Butcher, football player
 George Dayton, banker and real estate developer in Worthington before moving to Minneapolis to start Dayton's Department Store (now part of Macy's); the recently restored (2003), 1890 George D. Dayton House is a community historic site on the National Register of Historic Places that now functions as a bed and breakfast and venue for social events 
 Matt Entenza, former minority leader of Minnesota House of Representatives (2002–2006) and 2010 DFL candidate for governor of Minnesota; grew up in Worthington and attended Worthington public schools
 Gordon Forbes. lawyer and Minnesota state legislator
 Francis G. Judge, electrician, businessman, and Minnesota state legislator
 Big Tiny Little, pianist and television personality
 Peter Ludlow, prominent analytic philosopher
 Stephen Miller, fourth Governor of Minnesota from 1864–1866, settled in Worthington, representing area in Minnesota House of Representatives from 1873 to 1874; presidential elector 1876; buried in Worthington Cemetery
Gordon Moore (judge), Associate Justice of the Minnesota Supreme Court; former Nobles County Attorney from 2003–2012; judge in the District Court of Minnesota's 5th Judicial District from 2012–2020; Worthington resident for 25 years
 Lee Nystrom, NFL player, was born in Worthington
 Tim O'Brien, novelist known for Vietnam War literature, grew up in Worthington and references city in several of his novels, including Lake Okabena in The Things They Carried, published 1990
 John Olson, longtime state senator and Worthington native, represented southwestern Minnesota from 1959–1977; chaired Minnesota Senate's General Legislation Committee from 1967 to 1971 and Higher Education Committee (1971–1973)

Local events
Worthington hosts many annual events: Windsurfing Regatta & Music Festival (June), International Festival (July), King Turkey Day (September), and Holiday Parade (November).

Media
The Globe serves Worthington, Nobles County, and surrounding areas with a print newspaper, an e-paper and website. It was purchased by the Forum Communications Company in 1995 and publishes a print edition on Wednesdays and an e-edition on Saturdays.

See also 
Impact of the COVID-19 pandemic on the meat industry in the United States

References

External links

City of Worthington
Community Web Site of Worthington, Minnesota
Historic Dayton House
Worthington Daily Globe newspaper site
Worthington Windsurfing Regatta and Unvarnished Music Festival

Cities in Nobles County, Minnesota
Cities in Minnesota
County seats in Minnesota